Elizabeth South railway station is located on the Gawler line.

History 
The station opened in 1955.

It once had a shelter and ticket office identical to that of Woodlands Park, but this was replaced in the late 1970s or early 1980s. On its western side, the station is adjacent to the Defence Science & Technology Group's Edinburgh site, and there is a walking track to the station for employees of DST Group. It has an island platform between the two railway tracks. Pedestrians cross the tracks at level since the underpass was closed due to concerns about safety and vandalism.

Between September 2011 and April 2012, at the same time as the Gawler Central line was being upgraded in preparation for electrification, the station was demolished and rebuilt.

Services by platform

References

External links

Railway stations in Adelaide